The Ontong Java flying fox (Pteropus howensis) is a species of flying fox in the family Pteropodidae. It is endemic to the  Ontong Java Atoll in the Solomon Islands.  Its natural habitats are subtropical or tropical dry forests and subtropical or tropical swamps. It was classified as "Critically Endangered" in 2021 by the IUCN .  Its confirmed range extends only over small islands, all of which are near to sea level.  It is threatened by rising sea levels.

Sources

Pteropus
Bats of Oceania
Endemic fauna of the Solomon Islands
Mammals of the Solomon Islands
Mammals described in 1931
Taxonomy articles created by Polbot